Friedrich Schauta (15 July 1849 – 10 January 1919) was an Austrian surgeon and gynecologist born in Vienna.

In 1874 he received his medical doctorate at the University of Vienna, and following graduation remained in Vienna as an assistant at the surgical clinic of Johann von Dumreicher (1815–1880). From 1876 to 1881 Schauta worked under Joseph Späth (1823-1896) at the latter's clinic of obstetrics and gynecology. In 1881 he became habilitated for OB/GYN at Vienna, and subsequently relocated to the University of Innsbruck, where in 1884 he became a full professor. Three years later, he succeeded August Breisky (1832-1889) in Prague, and in 1891 returned to Vienna as a successor to Carl Braun (1822-1891) as chair at the first department of gynecology and obstetrics.

Among his students and assistants were Ernst Wertheim (1864–1920), Josef von Halban (1870–1937) and Bianca Bienenfeld (1879–1929).

Schauta is remembered for introducing an operation for uterine cancer in which the uterus and ovaries are removed by way of the vagina (Schauta-Stoeckel operation). He published numerous articles in the fields of gynecology and obstetrics, two of his better known books being Grundriss der operative Geburtshilfe (Outline for operative obstetrics) and Lehrbuch der gesammten Gynäkologie (Textbook of complete gynecology).

With Rudolf Chrobak (1843-1910), he planned and managed the construction of a new hospital department for gynecology in Vienna. In 1929 the Schautagasse in Vienna-Favoriten was named in his honor.

Selected writings 
 Grundriss der operativen Geburtshilfe. Vienna and Leipzig, Edition 13 in 1896.  Outline for surgical obstetrics.
 Die Beckenanomalien. In Müller’s Handbuch der Geburtshilfe, second edition; Stuttgart, 1888.  Pelvic abnormalities.
 Indicationsstellung der vaginalen Totalexstirpation. Archiv für Gynäkologie, Berlin, XXXIX. - Indication and positioning of vaginal total extirpation.
 Indication und Technik der vaginalen Totalexstirpation. Zeitschrift für Heilkunde. 1891 - Indication and technique of vaginal total extirpation.
 Indication und Technik der Adnexoperationen. Verhandlungen der deutschen Gesellschaft für Gynäkologie, 1893 - Indication and technique of adnexa operation.
 Sectio caesarea vaginalis. Heilkunde, 1898.
 Lehrbuch der gesamten Gynäkologie. Leipzig and Vienna, 1895-1894. (Italian translation Turin, 1898; third edition, 1906/1907) - Textbook of complete gynecology.
 Die Österreichischen Gebäranstalten 1848-1898. In: Österreichische Wohlfahrtseinrichtungen, third edition; Vienna, 1901. Austrian maternity hospitals from 1848 to 1898.
 Tabulae gynaecologicae. (with Fritz Hitschmann 1870-1926). Vienna, 1905.

Associated eponyms 
 Schauta's operation: Surgical removal of the uterus and the adnexa (ovaries and oviducts).
 Schauta-Stoeckel operation: Now known as a radical vaginal hysterectomy with lymphadenectomy. This surgical procedure is done for early stages of uterine cancer. Named with German gynecologist Walter Stoeckel (1871-1961) who cooperated with the Nazis during World War II.

References 

 Friedrich Schauta @ Who Named It
   biography @ AEIOU Encyclopedia

19th-century Austrian people
Austrian gynaecologists
Austrian surgeons
Austrian obstetricians
Academic staff of the University of Vienna
Academic staff of the University of Innsbruck
Physicians from Vienna
1919 deaths
1849 births